ASB Business was a half-hour business news programme in New Zealand, with insights into issues affecting the business sector. It was broadcast on TV3 between 6.30am and 7.00am weekdays, followed by Sunrise.

Format
Since 2 October 2007, ASB Business had been a main part of Sunrise, which was on air from 6:30 am. In an aim to attract more business viewers, particularly in Auckland, it was decided that from 6 October 2008 that a new 30-minute version of ASB Business would be produced. It was hosted by financial journalist Michael Wilson starting at 6:30 am. Sunrise moved to start at 7:00 am and featured regular business updates.

TV3 cancelled ASB Business on 8 April 2010, stating the show was financially unsustainable.

Note that previously ASB Business was the name of rival TVNZ's morning business programme on TV One at a similar timeslot. This programme is now titled NZI Business

Team
 Michael Wilson - Host
 Tony Field - Backup Host
 Emma Brannam - Reporter
 Liz Kirschberg - Executive Producer

External links
 Live Stream

2000s New Zealand television series
2010s New Zealand television series
2008 New Zealand television series debuts
2010 New Zealand television series endings
Breakfast television in New Zealand
New Zealand television news shows
Three (TV channel) original programming